Behzad Farahani (born ) is an Iranian actor and screenwriter. He is the father of actresses Shaghayegh Farahani and Golshifteh Farahani.

Early and personal life
Farahani was born in Arak, Iran. He is married to stage actress Fahimeh Rahiminia. His daughters are Iranian actresses Shaghayegh Farahani, Golshifteh Farahani, and Azarakhsh Farahani.

Filmography
 Violent Punishment, 1971
 Journey of the Stone, 1978
 Wage, 1989
 Zero Heights, 1993
 Years of Restlessness, 1994
 The Kind Moon, 1995
 Tootia, 1998
 Sheida, 1999
 Grey, 2000
 Killing Mad Dogs, 2001

References

External links

1945 births
Living people
Iranian radio actors
Iranian screenwriters
People from Arak, Iran
Iranian male film actors
Iranian male television actors